Events in the year 1916 in Bulgaria.

Incumbents

Events 

 5 – 7 September – The Battle of Bazargic, also known as the Battle of Dobrich or the Dobrich epopee, took place.

References 

 
1910s in Bulgaria
Years of the 20th century in Bulgaria
Bulgaria
Bulgaria